In computer programming, Base64 is a group of binary-to-text encoding schemes that represent binary data (more specifically, a sequence of 8-bit bytes) in sequences of 24 bits that can be represented by four 6-bit Base64 digits.

Common to all binary-to-text encoding schemes, Base64 is designed to carry data stored in binary formats across channels that only reliably support text content. Base64 is particularly prevalent on the World Wide Web where one of its uses is the ability to embed image files or other binary assets inside textual assets such as HTML and CSS files.

Base64 is also widely used for sending e-mail attachments. This is required because SMTP – in its original form – was designed to transport 7-bit ASCII characters only. This encoding causes an overhead of 33–37% (33% by the encoding itself; up to 4% more by the inserted line breaks).

Design
Each Base64 digit can take on 64 different values, encoding 6 bits of data. Which characters are chosen to represent the 64 values varies between implementations. The general strategy is to choose 64 characters that are common to most encodings and that are also printable. This combination leaves the data unlikely to be modified in transit through information systems, such as email, that were traditionally not 8-bit clean. For example, MIME's Base64 implementation uses A–Z, a–z, and 0–9 for the first 62 values. Other variations share this property but differ in the symbols chosen for the last two values; an example is UTF-7.

The earliest instances of this type of encoding were created for dial-up communication between systems running the same OS, for example, uuencode for UNIX and BinHex for the TRS-80 (later adapted for the Macintosh), and could therefore make more assumptions about what characters were safe to use. For instance, uuencode uses uppercase letters, digits, and many punctuation characters, but no lowercase.

Base64 table from RFC 4648
This is the Base64 alphabet defined in RFC 4648 §4 . See also Variants summary (below).

Examples
The example below uses ASCII text for simplicity, but this is not a typical use case, as it can already be safely transferred across all systems that can handle Base64. The more typical use is to encode binary data (such as an image); the resulting Base64 data will only contain 64 different ASCII characters, all of which can reliably be transferred across systems that may corrupt the raw source bytes.

Here is a well-known idiom from distributed computing:

When the quote (without trailing whitespace) is encoded into Base64, it is represented as a byte sequence of 8-bit-padded ASCII characters encoded in MIME's Base64 scheme as follows (newlines and white spaces may be present anywhere but are to be ignored on decoding):

In the above quote, the encoded value of Man is TWFu. Encoded in ASCII, the characters M, a, and n are stored as the byte values 77, 97, and 110, which are the 8-bit binary values 01001101, 01100001, and 01101110. These three values are joined together into a 24-bit string, producing 010011010110000101101110. Groups of 6 bits (6 bits have a maximum of 26 = 64 different binary values) are converted into individual numbers from start to end (in this case, there are four numbers in a 24-bit string), which are then converted into their corresponding Base64 character values.

As this example illustrates, Base64 encoding converts three octets into four encoded characters.

= padding characters might be added to make the last encoded block contain four Base64 characters.

Hexadecimal to octal transformation is useful to convert between binary and Base64. Such conversion is available for both advanced calculators and programming languages. For example, the hexadecimal representation of the 24 bits above is 4d616e. The octal representation is 23260556. Those 8 octal digits can be split into pairs, and each pair can be converted to decimal to yield . Using those four decimal numbers as indices for the Base64 alphabet, the corresponding ASCII characters are TWFu.

If there are only two significant input octets (e.g., 'Ma'), or when the last input group contains only two octets, all 16 bits will be captured in the first three Base64 digits (18 bits); the two least significant bits of the last content-bearing 6-bit block will turn out to be zero, and discarded on decoding (along with the succeeding = padding character):

If there is only one significant input octet (e.g., 'M'), or when the last input group contains only one octet, all 8 bits will be captured in the first two Base64 digits (12 bits); the four least significant bits of the last content-bearing 6-bit block will turn out to be zero, and discarded on decoding (along with the succeeding two = padding characters):

Output padding
Because Base64 is a six-bit encoding, and because the decoded values are divided into 8-bit octets, every four characters of Base64-encoded text (4 sextets =  = 24 bits) represents three octets of unencoded text or data (3 octets =  = 24 bits). This means that when the length of the unencoded input is not a multiple of three, the encoded output must have padding added so that its length is a multiple of four. The padding character is =, which indicates that no further bits are needed to fully encode the input. (This is different from A, which means that the remaining bits are all zeros.) The example below illustrates how truncating the input of the above quote changes the output padding:

The padding character is not essential for decoding, since the number of missing bytes can be inferred from the length of the encoded text. In some implementations, the padding character is mandatory, while for others it is not used. An exception in which padding characters are required is when multiple Base64 encoded files have been concatenated.

Decoding Base64 with padding
When decoding Base64 text, four characters are typically converted back to three bytes. The only exceptions are when padding characters exist. A single = indicates that the four characters will decode to only two bytes, while == indicates that the four characters will decode to only a single byte. For example:

Another way to interpret the padding character is to consider it as an instruction to discard 2 trailing bits from the bit string each time a = is encountered. For example, when `` is decoded, we convert each character (except the trailing occurrences of =) into their corresponding 6-bit representation, and then discard 2 trailing bits for the first = and another 2 trailing bits for the other =. In this instance, we would get 6 bits from the d, and another 6 bits from the w for a bit string of length 12, but since we remove 2 bits for each = (for a total of 4 bits), the dw== ends up producing 8 bits (1 byte) when decoded.

Decoding Base64 without padding
Without padding, after normal decoding of four characters to three bytes over and over again, fewer than four encoded characters may remain. In this situation, only two or three characters can remain. A single remaining encoded character is not possible, because a single Base64 character only contains 6 bits, and 8 bits are required to create a byte, so a minimum of two Base64 characters are required: The first character contributes 6 bits, and the second character contributes its first 2 bits. For example:

Implementations and history

Variants summary table
Implementations may have some constraints on the alphabet used for representing some bit patterns. This notably concerns the last two characters used in the alphabet at positions 62 and 63, and the character used for padding (which may be mandatory in some protocols or removed in others). The table below summarizes these known variants and provides links to the subsections below.

Privacy-enhanced mail
PEM defines a "printable encoding" scheme that uses Base64 encoding to transform an arbitrary sequence of octets to a format that can be expressed in short lines of 6-bit characters, as required by transfer protocols such as SMTP.

The current version of PEM (specified in ) uses a 64-character alphabet consisting of upper- and lower-case Roman letters (A–Z, a–z), the numerals (0–9), and the + and / symbols. The = symbol is also used as a padding suffix. The original specification, additionally used the * symbol to delimit encoded but unencrypted data within the output stream.

To convert data to PEM printable encoding, the first byte is placed in the most significant eight bits of a 24-bit buffer, the next in the middle eight, and the third in the least significant eight bits. If there are fewer than three bytes left to encode (or in total), the remaining buffer bits will be zero. The buffer is then used, six bits at a time, most significant first, as indices into the string: "ABCDEFGHIJKLMNOPQRSTUVWXYZabcdefghijklmnopqrstuvwxyz0123456789+/", and the indicated character is output.

The process is repeated on the remaining data until fewer than four octets remain. If three octets remain, they are processed normally. If fewer than three octets (24 bits) are remaining to encode, the input data is right-padded with zero bits to form an integral multiple of six bits.

After encoding the non-padded data, if two octets of the 24-bit buffer are padded-zeros, two = characters are appended to the output; if one octet of the 24-bit buffer is filled with padded-zeros, one = character is appended. This signals the decoder that the zero bits added due to padding should be excluded from the reconstructed data. This also guarantees that the encoded output length is a multiple of 4 bytes.

PEM requires that all encoded lines consist of exactly 64 printable characters, with the exception of the last line, which may contain fewer printable characters. Lines are delimited by whitespace characters according to local (platform-specific) conventions.

MIME

The MIME (Multipurpose Internet Mail Extensions) specification lists Base64 as one of two binary-to-text encoding schemes (the other being quoted-printable).

MIME does not specify a fixed length for Base64-encoded lines, but it does specify a maximum line length of 76 characters. Additionally, it specifies that any character outside the standard set of 64 encoding characters (For example CRLF sequences), must be ignored by a compliant decoder, although most implementations use a CR/LF newline pair to delimit encoded lines.

Thus, the actual length of MIME-compliant Base64-encoded binary data is usually about 137% of the original data length (×), though for very short messages the overhead can be much higher due to the overhead of the headers. Very roughly, the final size of Base64-encoded binary data is equal to 1.37 times the original data size + 814 bytes (for headers). The size of the decoded data can be approximated with this formula:
 bytes = (string_length(encoded_string) − 814) / 1.37

UTF-7

This data encoding scheme is used to encode UTF-16 as ASCII characters for use in 7-bit transports such as SMTP. It is a variant of the Base64 encoding used in MIME.

The "Modified Base64" alphabet consists of the MIME Base64 alphabet, but does not use the "=" padding character. UTF-7 is intended for use in mail headers (defined in ), and the "=" character is reserved in that context as the escape character for "quoted-printable" encoding. Modified Base64 simply omits the padding and ends immediately after the last Base64 digit containing useful bits leaving up to three unused bits in the last Base64 digit.

OpenPGP

Radix-64 is identical to the "Base64" encoding described by MIME, with the addition of an optional 24-bit CRC. The checksum is calculated on the input data before encoding; the checksum is then encoded with the same Base64 algorithm and, prefixed by the "=" symbol as the separator, appended to the encoded output data.

RFC 3548

RFC 4648
This RFC obsoletes RFC 3548 and focuses on Base64/32/16:

 This document describes the commonly used Base64, Base32, and Base16 encoding schemes. It also discusses the use of line feeds in encoded data, the use of padding in encoded data, the use of non-alphabet characters in encoded data, the use of different encoding alphabets, and canonical encodings.

URL applications
Base64 encoding can be helpful when fairly lengthy identifying information is used in an HTTP environment. For example, a database persistence framework for Java objects might use Base64 encoding to encode a relatively large unique id (generally 128-bit UUIDs) into a string for use as an HTTP parameter in HTTP forms or HTTP GET URLs. Also, many applications need to encode binary data in a way that is convenient for inclusion in URLs, including in hidden web form fields, and Base64 is a convenient encoding to render them in a compact way.

Using standard Base64 in URL requires encoding of '+', '/' and '=' characters into special percent-encoded hexadecimal sequences ('+' becomes '%2B', '/' becomes '%2F' and '=' becomes '%3D'), which makes the string unnecessarily longer.

For this reason, modified Base64 for URL variants exist (such as  base64url in ), where the '+' and '/' characters of standard Base64 are respectively replaced by '-' and '_', so that using URL encoders/decoders is no longer necessary and has no effect on the length of the encoded value, leaving the same encoded form intact for use in relational databases, web forms, and object identifiers in general. A popular site to make use of such is YouTube. Some variants allow or require omitting the padding '=' signs to avoid them being confused with field separators, or require that any such padding be percent-encoded. Some libraries  will encode '=' to '.', potentially exposing applications to relative path attacks when a folder name is encoded from user data.

HTML
The atob() and btoa() JavaScript methods, defined in the HTML5 draft specification, provide Base64 encoding and decoding functionality to web pages. The btoa() method outputs padding characters, but these are optional in the input of the atob() method.

Other applications
Base64 can be used in a variety of contexts:

 Base64 can be used to transmit and store text that might otherwise cause delimiter collision
 Base64 is used to encode character strings in LDAP Data Interchange Format files
 Base64 is often used to embed binary data in an XML file, using a syntax similar to <data encoding="base64">…</data> e.g. favicons in Firefox's exported bookmarks.html.
 Base64 is used to encode binary files such as images within scripts, to avoid depending on external files.
 The data URI scheme can use Base64 to represent file contents. For instance, background images and fonts can be specified in a CSS stylesheet file as data: URIs, instead of being supplied in separate files.
 Although not part of the official specification for SVG, some viewers can interpret Base64 when used for embedded elements, such as images inside SVG.
 Base64 can be used to store/transmit relatively small amounts of binary data via a computer's text clipboard functionality, especially in cases where the information doesn't warrant being permanently saved or when information must be quickly sent between a wide variety of different, potentially incompatible programs. An example is the representation of the public keys of cryptocurrency recipients as Base64 encoded text strings, which can be easily copied and pasted into users' wallet software. 
 Binary data that must be quickly verified by humans as a safety mechanism, such as file checksums or key fingerprints, is often represented in Base64 for easy checking, sometimes with additional formatting, such as separating each group of four characters in the representation of a PGP key fingerprint with a space. 
 QR codes which contain binary data will sometimes store it encoded in Base64 rather than simply storing the raw binary data, as there is a stronger guarantee that all QR code readers will accurately decode text, as well as the fact that some devices will more readily save text from a QR code than potentially malicious binary data.

Applications not compatible with RFC 4648 Base64 
Some applications use a Base64 alphabet that is significantly different from the alphabets used in the most common Base64 variants (see Variants summary table above).

 The Uuencoding alphabet includes no lowercase characters, instead using ASCII codes 32 (" " (space)) through 95 ("_"), consecutively. Uuencoding uses the alphabet " !"#$%&'()*+,-./0123456789:;<=>?@ABCDEFGHIJKLMNOPQRSTUVWXYZ[\]^_". Avoiding all lower-case letters was helpful, because many older printers only printed uppercase. Using consecutive ASCII characters saved computing power, because it was only necessary to add 32, without requiring a lookup table. Its use of most punctuation characters and the space character may limit its usefulness in some applications, such as those that use these characters as syntax.
 BinHex 4 (HQX), which was used within the classic Mac OS, excludes some visually confusable characters like '7', 'O', 'g' and 'o'. Its alphabet includes additional punctuation characters. It uses the alphabet "!"#$%&'()*+,-012345689@ABCDEFGHIJKLMNPQRSTUVXYZ[`abcdefhijklmpqr".
 A UTF-8 environment can use non-synchronized continuation bytes as base64: 0b10xxxxxx. See UTF-8#Self-synchronization.
 Several other applications use alphabets similar to the common variations, but in a different order:
 Unix stores password hashes computed with crypt in the /etc/passwd file using an encoding called B64. crypt's alphabet puts the punctuation . and / before the alphanumeric characters. crypt uses the alphabet "./0123456789ABCDEFGHIJKLMNOPQRSTUVWXYZabcdefghijklmnopqrstuvwxyz". Padding is not used.
 The GEDCOM 5.5 standard for genealogical data interchange encodes multimedia files in its text-line hierarchical file format. GEDCOM uses the same alphabet as crypt, which is "./0123456789ABCDEFGHIJKLMNOPQRSTUVWXYZabcdefghijklmnopqrstuvwxyz".
 bcrypt hashes are designed to be used in the same way as traditional crypt(3) hashes, but bcrypt's alphabet is in a different order than crypt's. bcrypt uses the alphabet "./ABCDEFGHIJKLMNOPQRSTUVWXYZabcdefghijklmnopqrstuvwxyz0123456789".
Xxencoding uses the alphabet "+-0123456789ABCDEFGHIJKLMNOPQRSTUVWXYZabcdefghijklmnopqrstuvwxyz".
 6PACK, used with some terminal node controllers, uses an alphabet from 0x00 to 0x3f.
 Bash supports numeric literals in Base64. Bash uses the alphabet "0123456789abcdefghijklmnopqrstuvwxyzABCDEFGHIJKLMNOPQRSTUVWXYZ@_".

One issue with the RFC 4648 alphabet is that, when a sorted list of ASCII-encoded strings is Base64-transformed and sorted again, the order of elements changes. This is because the padding character and the characters in the substitution alphabet are not ordered by ASCII character value (which can be seen by using the following sample table's sort buttons). Alphabets like (unpadded) B64 address this.

See also
 8BITMIME
 Ascii85 (also called Base85)
 Base16
 Base32
 Base36
 Base62
 Binary-to-text encoding for a comparison of various encoding algorithms
 Binary number
 URL

References

Usenet
Email
Internet Standards
Binary-to-text encoding formats
Data serialization formats
Power-of-two numeral systems